Giorgi Nergadze  (born 20 August 1982) is a Georgian football player. He is a midfielder and plays for Bidvest Wits in the South African Premier Soccer League.

External links
  Player profile at Dinamo's official web-site
 

1982 births
Living people
Footballers from Georgia (country)
Association football midfielders
FC Dinamo Tbilisi players
FC Dinamo Batumi players
Moroka Swallows F.C. players
Bidvest Wits F.C. players

his kids=nikoloz and gigi